Joseph "Joe" Sugden is a fictional character from the British television soap opera Emmerdale, played by Frazer Hines. He first appeared on-screen during the soap's first episode broadcast 16 October 1972 and remained in the programme until 1983. After a brief return in the following year, Hines reprised his role on a permanent basis in 1986, a landmark year for the show under Richard Handford. He made his last appearance in August 1994, and subsequently died off-screen the following year. In 2019, Hines confirmed that he would like to return to the soap despite his off-screen death.

Development
Joe is a farmer as was his father. When Emmerdale began it depicted actual farm life. Rather than act out tasks Hines learned to dip sheep and milk cows.

Joe is involved in a relationship with Christine Sharp (Angela Cheyne). They married during the episode broadcast 10 September 1974. The duo overcome a series of problems before marrying and Christine has the wedding day "she'd always dreamed of". To commemorate the event TVTimes featured a promotional souvenir photograph for readers prior to the episode's airdate.

Storylines
Joseph Joe Sugden II born 31 May 1949 named after his grandfather Joseph Sugden I is the youngest child of Jacob and Annie Sugden (Sheila Mercier). After Jacob dies, the family learn that he has left the farm to his estranged son, Jack Sugden, who divides it between the family.

After a failed attempt at courting Marian Wilks (Gail Harrison), Joe starts dating Christine Sharp and they soon marry but separate when Christine decides she does not want to be a farmer's wife. Christine returns the following year to reconcile but Joe wants a divorce and she leaves for good. Joe's next relationship is with Kathy Gimbel (Polly Hemingway), who moves in with him. Their relationship is a huge talking point in the village as Kathy is separated from her husband, Kenny. When Kathy's father, Jim (John Atkinson) shoots himself, Kathy leaves Joe to live with her mother, Freda (Mary Henry).

Joe gets a job working for NY estates and gets jobs for his nephew Jackie Merrick (Ian Sharrock) and Jackie's half-sister Sandie (Jane Hutcheson). Joe develops feelings for vicar's daughter, Barbara Peters (Rosie Kerslake) in 1983 but is rejected and moves to France for several years but briefly returns for the funeral of his grandfather, Sam Pearson (Toke Townley), in November 1984. In 1986, Joe returns permanently and becomes regional manager for NY Estates. During this time, he has a brief relationship with Karen Moore (Annie Hulley) who had previously had an affair with Jack but Karen ends the relationship.

Joe meets divorcee Kate Hughes (Sally Knyvette), and her two teenage children, Rachel (Glenda McKay) and Mark Hughes (Craig McKay). Initially Kate and Joe argue after he shoots her dog for bothering his sheep but they eventually they fall in love. Joe proposes, but with Mark and Rachel opposed and wanting Kate to reconcile with their father, David (Martyn Whitby), Joe becomes worried. They do marry and Kate's children eventually come round to their mother's new marriage. Kate accidentally runs over Pete Whiteley, killing him and is jailed for a year but is released the following January. Kate tells Joe the marriage is over and returns to Sheffield. Rachel and Mark decide to stay and Joe forms a closer relationship with them.

Joe and Mark argue over a vacuum cleaner that needs returning so Mark goes to the Whiteley Farm when a large section of an Eastern European Airjet comes down, knocking down a wall which falls on Mark, killing him. Joe, his mother, Annie and her new husband Leonard Kempinski (Bernard Archard) are also hit when another part of the plane hits his car. Joe breaks a leg, Annie is left comatose but Leonard is killed. When Joe learns of Mark's death, he becomes very depressed and blames himself.

After saving Dave Glover (Ian Kelsey) from being run over by a car, Jack and Rachel persuade him go and spend time with Annie in Spain. The following year, news reaches Emmerdale that Joe has died in a car crash. Annie and Amos Brearly (Ronald Magill) return to the village for his funeral.

Reception
The character was selected as one of the "top 100 British soap characters" by industry experts for a poll to be run by What's on TV, with readers able to vote for their favourite character to discover "Who is Soap's greatest Legend?" In 1998, writers from Inside Soap published an article about the top ten characters they wanted to return to soap. Joe was featured and they opined that "his gentle charm and Yorkshire grit made him irresistible to a seemingly endless stream of women."

References

External links
Joe Sugden at MTV3

Emmerdale characters
Fictional farmers
Television characters introduced in 1972
Male characters in television